Brick Breaker is a video game, which was developed by Ali Asaria, that came preloaded on the BlackBerry and is now available on App Store (iOS).

Gameplay
Brick Breaker (platformer) is a Breakout clone which the player must smash a wall of bricks by deflecting a bouncing ball with a paddle. The paddle may move horizontally and is controlled with the BlackBerry's trackwheel, the computer's mouse or the touch of a finger (in the case of touchscreen). The player gets 3 lives to start with; a life is lost if the ball hits the bottom of the screen. When all the bricks have been destroyed, the player advances to a new, harder level. There are 34 levels. Many levels have unbreakable silver bricks. If all lives are lost, the game is over. There are many versions of brick breaker, some in which you can shoot flaming fireballs or play with more than one ball if the player gets a power up.

Reception
Brick Breaker has a cult following of professional players trying to achieve high scores. The game's addictiveness was highlighted by The Vancouver Sun: There are "dozens of forums, support groups and yes, a Brick Breaker Addiction Facebook page, with spouses complaining of addicted mates."

References

BlackBerry
Mobile games
BlackBerry games
Video games developed in Canada